This is a list companies in Amarillo, Texas that are headquartered or have a large presence in the city.

Corporate presence
Amarillo Design Bureau, a company specializing in tactical and strategic board wargames
Amarillo National Bank, one of the largest privately held banks in the US
Pantex, nuclear weapons assembly and disassembly

Major companies in Amarillo
ASARCO, copper smelter
Bell Helicopter Textron, helicopter and tiltrotor manufacturer
Big Lots, retail
BNSF Railway, railroad
Owens-Corning, fiberglass
Tyson Foods, beef processor
Weyerhaeuser, paper and packaging
Xcel Energy, electric provider

References

 
Lists of companies based in Texas